Vasili Popov may refer to:

 Vasily Stepanovich Popov (1894–1967), Soviet general
 Vasili Stepanovich Popov (1745–1822), Russian general
 Vasili Popov (politician), Soviet politician who was Minister of Finance of the RSFSR
 Vasily Nikolaevich Popov (b. 1983), Russian poet, interpreter and painter.